La Chapelle-Blanche (literally The White Chapel; ; Gallo: La Chapèll-Blaunch) is a commune in the Côtes-d'Armor department of Brittany in northwestern France.

Population

Inhabitants of La Chapelle-Blanche are called Chapellois in French, as are those from many other places which have the word Chapelle in their names.

See also
Communes of the Côtes-d'Armor department

References

External links

Official website 

Communes of Côtes-d'Armor